In physics, specifically field theory and particle physics, the Proca action describes a massive spin-1 field of mass m in Minkowski spacetime. The corresponding equation is a relativistic wave equation called the Proca equation. The Proca action and equation are named after Romanian physicist Alexandru Proca.

The Proca equation is involved in the Standard Model and describes there the three massive vector bosons, i.e. the Z and W bosons.

This article uses the (+−−−) metric signature and tensor index notation in the language of 4-vectors.

Lagrangian density

The field  transforms like a complex four-vector.

The Lagrangian density is given by:

Equation

The Euler–Lagrange equation of motion for this case, also called the Proca equation, is:

which is equivalent to the conjunction of

with (in the massive case)

which may be called a generalized Lorenz gauge condition.  For non-zero sources, with all fundamental constants included, the field equation is:

When , the source free equations reduce to Maxwell's equations without charge or current, and the above reduces to Maxwell's charge equation. This Proca field equation is closely related to the Klein–Gordon equation, because it is second order in space and time.

In the vector calculus notation, the source free equations are:

Gauge fixing

The Proca action is the gauge-fixed version of the Stueckelberg action via the Higgs mechanism. Quantizing the Proca action requires the use of second class constraints.

If , they are not invariant under the gauge transformations of electromagnetism

where  is an arbitrary function.

See also
 Electromagnetic field
 Photon
 Quantum electrodynamics
 Quantum gravity
 Vector boson

References

Further reading 

 Supersymmetry Demystified, P. Labelle, McGraw–Hill (USA), 2010, 
 Quantum Field Theory, D. McMahon, Mc Graw Hill (USA), 2008, 
 Quantum Mechanics Demystified, D. McMahon, Mc Graw Hill (USA), 2006, 

Gauge theories